Leevi Mutru (born 16 May 1995) is a Finnish Nordic combined skier. He competed in the World Cup 2015 season.

He represented Finland at the FIS Nordic World Ski Championships 2015 in Falun.

References

External links 
 

1995 births
Living people
Finnish male Nordic combined skiers
Nordic combined skiers at the 2018 Winter Olympics
Olympic Nordic combined skiers of Finland
21st-century Finnish people